There is debate about the starting point of independent filmmaking in Bangladesh.

One noted film commentator and filmmaker, Manjare Hassin Murad likes to count Stop Genocide (1971), the documentary made by Zahir Raihan, the greatest filmmaker in 1960s as the first independent film in Bangladesh. The film was funded by newly formed Expatriate Government of Bangladesh staying in India while the country was battling with the West Pakistan Army. Some other critics like Zakir Hossain Raju  identified Suryo Dighal Bari (The Ominous House, 1979) as the first independent film funded by Bangladesh Government after independence in 1971 and it was made within the production and distribution network by Film Development Corporation (FDC), the only major studio in Bangladesh. The film brought first international success in post liberation era though it experienced different constraints in releasing and screening in theatres at home. But most of the film buffs consider Agami (Time Ahead, 1984) as the starting point of independent filmmaking. Because for critical and commercial success of Agami, independent filmmaking arrives as a movement. The movement was popularly known as ‘short film movement’ and later as ‘alternative film movement’. The movement got the shape after both critical and commercial success of Agami by Morshedul Islam and Hulyia (Wanted, 1984) by Tanvir Mokammel. Agami got the silver peacock in the best director category in Delhi International Film Festival. Hulyia also got admirations of critics and audience.

These films were funded by directors themselves with support of friends and family members and were shown outside cinema theatres: among the friends, local groups, especially among the students of college and universities and cultural activists. The directors were involved in the entire process of the filmmaking: writing scripts, funding, making and screening. These two films were shown together in different corners of the country and these are real examples of independent films: low and independent funds, alternative distribution channels, shot in 16 mm, without any studio involvement and commercial motives and in content, very much related with national culture and politics. With this set standard and format, a lot of young makers came forward later and a movement started. However, while the contemporary mainstream films have failed to achieve any accolades at home or abroad; directors of the independent genre such as, Tareque and Catherine Masud, Tanvir Mokammel, Morshedul Islam and Abu Sayeed have gained national and international recognition. Matir Moina by Tareque Masud is the most famous independent film and also the most prominent film so far from Bangladesh. Some other good independent films of Bangladesh are: Chaka (1993) and Khelaghar (2006) by Morshedul Islam, Chitra Nadir Pare (1999) and Lalsalu (2001) by Tanvir Mokammel, Shankhonaad (2004) and Nirontor (2007) by Abu Sayeed, Muktir Gaan (1995), Ontarjatra (2006) by Tareque Masud and Catherine Masud, Swapnodanai (2007) by Golam Robbani Biplob.

See also
 Cinema of Bangladesh
 Bangladesh National Film Award for Best Film
 List of Bangladeshi submissions for the Academy Award for Best Foreign Language Film
 List of Bangladeshi films
 History of Cinema
 Cinema of the world
 Cinema of West Bengal